Monkey Business 1972–1997 is an album by English musicians John Wetton and Richard Palmer-James, it features various demos and live performances of songs by King Crimson (of which Wetton and Palmer-James were singer/bassist and lyricist respectively), Jack-Knife (which was another Wetton and Palmer-James project) and John Wetton. The album was first released 1998 and again in 2014 with I Wish You Would by Jack-Knife.

Overview 
The collaboration between the two musicians started already in 1962 when they met at school. In 1972 they rejoined forces in King Crimson (KC), in which Palmer-James only wrote the lyrics. Some of the material that would have been on the follow-up of Wetton's last album with KC, Red, is found here in the demo form. The classic KC songs 'Book of Saturday' and 'Starless' are featured as lyric less raw demos that were home taped as a basis for lyric-writing. To be more precise, the latter is only as a half minute beginning - twice! But the disc ends pleasantly with the pair's recording of 'Starless' from 1997. From the same year are 'Doctor Diamond' and 'Cologne 1997', both among the most worthy contents of this release. The latter song, concerning "the mixed feelings of many Americans born after 1945 of German origin on first visiting their emigre parents' home country", is featured also in its original form recorded in 1977.

Some of the material appears out of some writing sessions from late 1976 when the two musician spend sometime at a French farmhouse, writing material for  

The album features Wetton and Palmer-James on most of the instrumentation, with Palmer-James playing guitar and some vocals (as he did with Supertramp) also on programming, and Wetton on bass, guitar keyboards and most vocals. A lot of musical contributors from various stages in Wetton's musical career, including former King Crimson bandmate, Bill Bruford (drums), fellow Jack-Knife members John Hutcheson (Hammond organ) and Curt Cress (drums). The live tracks feature various members of John Wetton's live band including Thomas Radl (drums), Ramon Vega (guitar) and Bob Dalton (cymbals) and John Beck (keyboards), Dalton and Beck are also members of Prog pop band It Bites. Due to the nature of the album being a compilation, it was recorded in various locations including studio's in Munich in Germany (where Palmer-James lived) also London, Sussex and Befordshire.

Track listing

Personnel

Musicians 

 John Wetton – vocals (all but 1, 5, 7, 22), additional vocals (22), bass guitar (2, 3, 12), guitar (3, 5, 6, 11, 12, 17, 18, 21), piano (4, 13, 14, 16, 20), clavinet (8), keyboards (12), all instruments (10, 19)
 Richard Palmer-James – guitar (2, 8), all instruments/programming (9, 15, 22, 23, 24), additional keyboards (19), vocals (23)
 Ramon Vega – guitar (5)
 John Hutcheson – Hammond organ (2); black and white photography
 John Beck – keyboards (14)
 Curt Cress – drums (2)
 Bill Bruford – drums (3, 4, 12)
 Thomas Radl – drums (5)
 Bob Dalton – cymbal (14)

Production 

 John Wetton – production, sleeve art direction
 Richard Palmer-James – production, sleeve art direction, pre-mastering on a Macintosh, recording (6, 8, 9, 11, 15, 16, 17, 18, 20, 21, 22, 23, 24), mixing (9, 15, 22, 23, 24)
 Martin Smith – mixing (5)
 Jürgen Koppers – recording and mixing (2)
 Julian Mendelsohn – recording (3, 10, 12, 19
 Paul Kennedy – vocals recording (9, 15, 22, 23, 24)
 Ichi Ichinobu – recording (14)
 Rob Ayling – coordinator
 Mixed Images Ltd. – design
 Chris Thorpe – mastering at Serendipity

References 

1998 compilation albums
John Wetton albums